William Henry Millard (25 May 1856 – 20 July 1923) was an English cricketer.  Millard was a right-handed batting whose bowling style is unknown.  He was born at New Swindon, Wiltshire.

Millard made his first-class debut for Sussex against Kent at the County Ground, Hove.  He made four further first-class appearances for the county, the last of which came against the Marylebone Cricket Club in 1880.  In his five first-class matches, he scored a total of 54 runs at an average of 6.75, with a high score of 26.  With the ball, he took 2 wickets at a bowling average of 22.00, with best figures of 2/32.

He died at Tenby, Pembrokeshire, Wales on 20 July 1923.

References

External links
William Millard at ESPNcricinfo
William Millard at CricketArchive

1856 births
1923 deaths
Sportspeople from Swindon
English cricketers
Sussex cricketers